Candalepas Associates is an architecture firm founded in 1999 by Angelo Candalepas in Sydney, Australia. It received numerous state and national awards by the Australian Institute of Architects.
Candalepas' design has been influenced by the architecture of Alvar Aalto and Jørn Utzon.

Selected projects

 2005 Pindari Apartments, Randwick, Sydney
 2008 All Saints Primary School, Belmore, Sydney. Sir John Sulman Medal
 2010 Waterloo Street Apartments, Surry Hills, Sydney. AIA National Award
 2011 Francis Street Apartments, Bondi, Sydney
 2012 Multiple Housing 29–35 Prince Street, Cronulla. AIA National Award
 2015 AHL Headquarters, 478 George Street, Sydney. Harry Seidler Award
 2015 St Andrews House, Sydney. AIA National Award
 2017 Punchbowl Mosque, Sydney. Sir John Sulman Medal

Further reading
 Candalepas, A. ed. (2021) Angelo Candalepas: Buildings and Projects, Park Books, Zürich.

References

External links

Architecture firms of Australia
Australian companies established in 1999